Johny Hoffmann (12 October 1944 – 7 February 2018) was a Luxembourgian footballer. He played in 19 matches for the Luxembourg national football team from 1968 to 1972.

References

1944 births
2018 deaths
Luxembourgian footballers
Luxembourg international footballers
Place of birth missing
Association footballers not categorized by position